Vietnam's Next Top Model, Cycle 6 is the sixth season of Vietnam's Next Top Model. It premiered on August 2, 2015 on VTV. For the third time, males were still featured as part of the show. This year, former host Phạm Thị Thanh Hằng, who hosted Cycle 4 (the first guys-and-girls season of the show), returned to fulfill her position as head judge of the panel. Samuel Hoàng reprised his role as a judge after Cycle 5 concluded. Designer Adrian Anh Tuấn was also introduced as a new judge. This season's theme is: Keep Moving - Không Ngừng Chuyển Động.

The winner was 20-year-old Nguyễn Thị Hương Ly from Gia Lai. Later, she competed Miss Universe Vietnam 2019, where she placed Top 5.

Nguyen Thi Hop & Luong Thi Hong Xuan both competed in the All-stars season of this series, where they placed 6th and 12th respectively.

H'Hen Niê, who finished 9th/8th place, was later crowned Miss Universe Vietnam 2017 and represented Vietnam in Miss Universe 2018, where she placed Top 5.

Overview

Requirements
All applying contestants for the show had to meet the following requirements:
Young men and women had to be Vietnamese citizens or foreigners of Vietnamese origin.
Be between the ages of 18-25. 
Meet a minimum height requirement of 170 cm (for women) and 175 cm (for men) 
Not be managed exclusively by companies, agencies, or products. 
Have no criminal record

Auditions

Next Top Model Online
Similar the last cycle, the organizers of the show began a contest named Next Top Model Online on Facebook and the official website of the competition. After the contest, the ten aspiring contestants with the highest number of votes will be allowed to advance to the bikini round during casting week.

Contestants

Episodes

Episode 1
Original Airdate: 

This was the casting episode. The fourteen finalists were chosen.

Episode 2
Original Airdate: 

The top fourteen get their makeovers.

Challenge winner: Nguyễn Thị Hợp
First call-out: Đinh Đức Thành
Bottom two: Nguyễn Thị Hương Ly & Nguyễn Thành Quốc
Eliminated: Nguyễn Thành Quốc

Episode 3
Original Airdate: 

First call-out: Đinh Đức Thành	 
Bottom two: Hoàng Gia Anh Vũ & Nguyễn Thị Hợp	 
Originally eliminated: Nguyễn Thị Ỏ Ỏ

Episode 4
Original Airdate: 

Challenge winner: H' Hen Niê 
First call-out: Hoàng Anh Tú
Bottom four: Dao Thi Thu, Nguyen Thi Hop, Tran Hai Dang & Nguyễn Thị Kim Phuong
Eliminated: Tran Hai Dang & Nguyen Thi Kim Phuong

Episode 5
Original Airdate: 

Challenge winner: Nguyễn Thị Hương Ly
First call-out: H' Hen Niê
Bottom two: Hoàng Gia Anh Vũ & Nguyễn Thị Hợp
Eliminated: Hoàng Gia Anh Vũ

Episode 6
Original Airdate: 

Challenge winner: Võ Thành An
First call-out: Đào Thị Thu
Bottom two: Lương Thị Hồng Xuân & Nguyễn Thị Hồng Vân
Eliminated: None

Episode 7
Original Airdate: 

First call-out:Nguyễn Thị Hương Ly
Bottom two: Hoàng Anh Tú & Nguyễn Thị Hợp
Eliminated: Hoàng Anh Tú

Episode 8
Original Airdate: 

Challenge winner: Lương Thị Hồng Xuân
First call-out:  Lương Thị Hồng Xuân
Bottom three: Đào Thị Thu, Đinh Đức Thành & H' Hen Niê 
Eliminated: Đào Thị Thu & H'Hen Niê

Episode 9
Original Airdate: 

First call-out: Võ Thành An	
Bottom two: Nguyễn Thị Hồng Vân & Nguyễn Thị Hương Ly  
Eliminated: Nguyễn Thị Hồng Vân

Episode 10
Original Airdate: 

Challenge winner: Nguyễn Thị Hương Ly
First call-out: Lương Thị Hồng Xuân
Bottom three: Đinh Đức Thành, K' Brơi & Nguyễn Thị Hương Ly
Eliminated: Đinh Đức Thành & K' Brơi

Episode 11
Original Airdate: 

Final four: Lương Thị Hồng Xuân, Nguyễn Thị Hợp, Nguyễn Thị Hương Ly & Võ Thành An  
Vietnam's Next Top Model 2015: Nguyễn Thị Hương Ly

Summaries

Call-out order

 The contestant was eliminated
 The contestant was originally eliminated from the competition but was saved
 The contestant was part of a non-eliminating bottom two
 The contestant won the competition

In episode 1, the call-out order did not reflect each model's performance.

Average  call-out order
Episode 1 is not included

Photo shoot guide
Episode 1 photo shoot: Promotional photos
Episode 2 photo shoot: Posing with logo "keep moving"
Episode 3 photo shoot: Rock climbing
Episode 4 photo shoot: Popular fashion trends in groups
Episode 5 photo shoot: Colorful leotards in the jungle with monkeys & fruit headdresses
Episode 6 photo shoot: Breakfast at Tiffany's inspired in pairs
Episode 7 photo shoot: CANIFA lookbook in pairs
Episode 8 photo shoot: Underwater jumpsuits
Episode 9 photo shoots: Indoor skydiving; Editorial lookbook
Episode 10 commercial & photo shoot: Samsung Galaxy S6 Edge Plus Advertisement
Episode 11 photo shoots: Posing on Suspended Hoops

Judges
Phạm Thị Thanh Hằng  (Host)
Samuel Hoàng
Adrian Anh Tuấn

References

External links
Official website

Vietnam's Next Top Model
2010s Vietnamese television series
2015 Vietnamese television seasons